Chuts  is the name applied to Jews who immigrated to London from the Netherlands during the latter part of the 19th century. They typically came from Amsterdam and practised trades they had already learned there, most notably cigar-, cap- and slipper-making.

They settled mostly in a small system of streets in Spitalfields known as the Tenterground, formerly an enclosed area where Flemish weavers stretched and dried cloth on machines called tenters (hence the expression "on tenterhooks"). By the 19th century, the site had been built upon with housing, but remained an enclave where the Dutch immigrants lived as a close-knit and generally separate community. Demolished and rebuilt during the twentieth century, the area is now bounded by White's Row, Wentworth Street, Bell Lane and Toynbee Street (formerly Shepherd Street).

Following the assassination of Tsar Alexander II of Russia in 1881, many thousands of Jewish refugees, fleeing political unrest in Eastern Europe, arrived in the East End of London, including the Tenterground, by which time the Chuts had begun to disperse. Significantly, the successful introduction of machinery for the mass production of cigarettes ultimately led to the collapse of the cigar-making economy on which the Chuts community depended. Many Chuts returned to improved conditions in Amsterdam, some emigrated further afield to places such as Australia and the United States, some assimilated into other Jewish families, and some eventually lost their Jewish identity altogether.

There was distinct rivalry between the Chuts and the later Jewish immigrants, not least because the Chuts had arrived as city-dwellers with useful industrial skills and by 1881 had already learned to speak English, whereas the later immigrants were generally impoverished rural workers who had to learn new trades in the notorious sweatshops and, arriving penniless and in great numbers, drew attention to the problem of immigration which resulted in the Aliens Act of 1905.

Furthermore, the Chuts were treated with suspicion by other Jews because the former had developed specific customs and practices, many of their families having lived in Amsterdam since the first synagogues were established there in the early years of the 17th century. Uniquely in Amsterdam, Ashkenazim (so-called "German Jews") and Sephardim (so-called "Spanish Jews") lived in close proximity for centuries, resulting in a cultural blend not found elsewhere. Most remarkably, the Dutch Jews were well accustomed to the sea, and ate seafoods considered not kosher by other Jewish communities.

Etymology
The origin of the name Chuts is uncertain. A popular assumption is that it derives from the Dutch word goed (pronounced  and meaning "good") and is imitative of the foreign-language chatter that others heard. It is also Hebrew  for "outside" or "in the street" and may have been applied to the Dutch Jews of London either because they were socially isolated or because many were street vendors. Another possibility is that the Hebrew word would have appeared increasingly in Amsterdam synagogue records as more and more emigrated to London, and others who followed would have "gone chuts" (i.e., emigrated).

The word Chut is sometimes used as a singular noun but is most likely a back-formation.

Conditions in the Netherlands prior to immigration
Despite Napoleonic emancipation in 1793, Jews remained barred from entry into the guilds in the Netherlands and were not permitted to be shopkeepers (with few exceptions, e.g. kosher butchers) for fear of the competition they would present to other Dutch. They were also denied entry into the state school system.

In spite of the efforts of William III after the defeat of Napoleon, the Ashkenazi Dutch concentrated in Amsterdam in slum conditions and resisted integration. Prejudice against them, although not amounting to religious persecution, continued through the mid-19th century. These factors together with the ongoing decline of the Dutch economy prompted a flow of Jewish emigrants from Amsterdam.

Notably, Jews in the UK benefited from formal emancipation in 1858, after which they could become skilled tradesmen and conduct business freely without taking Christian oaths.

See also
Sandys Row Synagogue
Ashkenazi Jews
Sephardi Jews
History of the Jews in the Netherlands
Jewish ethnic diversity

References

External links
19th Century London: a primary attraction for Ashkenazi Dutch immigration by Aubrey Jacobus. JewishGen KehilaLinks, Amsterdam, Netherlands
Sandys Row Synagogue history pages
Article on 19th century Dutch Jews in London with downloadable census data

 
Dutch-Jewish culture in the United Kingdom
Jewish Dutch history
Jewish English history